Dutch Caribbean Airlines was an airline based in Curaçao, part of the Kingdom of the Netherlands. It was established in 1964 and ceased operation in 2004.  The company slogan was Bridge to Curaçao.

History 
The airline was succeeded by Air ALM, which was owned by the same DC Holding that owned ALM Antillean Airlines and later Dutch Caribbean Airlines.

Destinations 

These are the destinations that were operated by "Dutch Caribbean Airlines" when the airline was in service:

Caribbean 

Oranjestad (Queen Beatrix International Airport)

Puerto Plata (Gregorio Luperón International Airport)
Punta Cana (Punta Cana International Airport)
Santo Domingo (Las Américas International Airport)

Port-au-Prince (Toussaint Louverture International Airport)

Kralendijk (Flamingo International Airport)
Willemstad (Hato International Airport)
Philipsburg (Princess Juliana International Airport)

Port of Spain (Piarco International Airport)

Europe 

Cologne (Cologne Bonn Airport)

Amsterdam (Amsterdam Schiphol Airport)

North America 

Miami (Miami International Airport)

South America 

Paramaribo (Johan Adolf Pengel International Airport)

Caracas/Maiquetía (Simón Bolívar International Airport)
Las Piedras (Josefa Camejo International Airport)
Maracaibo (La Chinita International Airport)
Valencia (Arturo Michelena International Airport)

Fleet 
During the transfer of the airline’s assets from Air ALM, the airline acquired some of the Air ALM aircraft and later on received other aircraft for its own.

Self owned aircraft

External links

Dutch Caribbean Airlines (Archive)
Dutch Caribbean Airlines Former Fleet Detail

Defunct airlines of the Netherlands Antilles
Defunct airlines of Curaçao
Airlines established in 2001
Airlines disestablished in 2004
1964 establishments in the Netherlands Antilles
2004 disestablishments in the Netherlands Antilles